This is a list of episodes from the 1980s CBS TV series, Newhart. The show ran from October 25, 1982, to May 21, 1990. The show starred Bob Newhart, Mary Frann, Tom Poston, Julia Duffy, Peter Scolari, Steven Kampmann, and Jennifer Holmes, as well as other recurring characters.

Series overview

Episodes

Season 1 (1982–83)
This is the only season to be shot on videotape.

Season 2 (1983–84)
Starting with this season and continuing for the remainder of the run, "Newhart" would be shot on film.

Season 3 (1984–85)

Season 4 (1985–86)

Season 5 (1986–87)

Season 6 (1987–88)

Season 7 (1988–89)

Season 8 (1989–90)

References

External links

Newhart